Margaux Farrell (born August 22, 1990) is an American-born swimmer who has represented France in international competition, and who won a bronze medal at the 2012 Summer Olympics.

She also holds four university school records, consisting of the 100, 200, and 500 freestyle, as well as the 100 backstroke.

She graduated Indiana University in 2012 and completed a master's degree in journalism from the University of Southern California in 2015.

References

External links
London 2012 Official Profile
 Profile at collegeswimming.com

1990 births
Living people
Knights of the Ordre national du Mérite
European Aquatics Championships medalists in swimming
French female freestyle swimmers
Indiana Hoosiers women's swimmers
Medalists at the 2012 Summer Olympics
Olympic bronze medalists for France
Olympic bronze medalists in swimming
Olympic swimmers of France
People from Glen Rock, New Jersey
Swimmers at the 2012 Summer Olympics
USC Annenberg School for Communication and Journalism alumni